The Gross Hills are the line of rugged hills and peaks located east of Schmidt Glacier, in the Heritage Range of Antarctica. They were named by the University of Minnesota Geological Party, 1963–64, for Barton Gross, a geologist with the party.

Features
Geographical features include:

 Courtney Peak
 Flanagan Glacier
 Rosen Peak
 Schmidt Glacier
 Ziegler Point

References

Hills of Ellsworth Land